Andrej Mitrović (17 April 1937 – 25 August 2013) was a Serbian historian, professor and author.

A specialist of the contemporary history of Serbia and Yugoslavia, Mitrović served as head of the Contemporary History Department at the Faculty of Philosophy, University of Belgrade. Throughout the years he wrote extensively about the First World War, the Paris Peace Conference, interwar Europe as well as articles on economic, social, cultural history and historiography. One of the leading Serbian historians of the 20th century, he was an honorary member of the Serbian Academy of Science and Arts, a member of the Montenegrin Academy of Sciences and Arts, and the recipient of several prestigious awards.

Early life and education 
Andrej Mitrović was born in Kragujevac on 17 April 1937, he completed elementary and secondary school in Kragujevac. Mitrović graduated in history from the Faculty of Philosophy, University of Belgrade, earning his master's degree in 1964 with the thesis "April negotiations on the Adriatic question at the 1919 peace conference" and his doctorate in 1967 with the thesis "Delegation of Serbs, Croats and Slovenes at the 1919-1920 Peace Conference".

Academic career 
Mitrović became faculty assistant in 1961, assistant professor in 1967, associate professor in 1974; that year he published Times Intolerant: A Political History of the Great Powers, 1919-1939 his award-winning book about the interwar growing ideological divisions and the intolerance that resulted from it. In 1980 he became professor at the Faculty of Philosophy in Belgrade, where he taught contemporary European history, introduction to historical studies and numerous specialised courses, In 1987 he became the head of the department of Modern History. In 1988 he became a corresponding fellow of the Serbian Academy of Sciences and Arts, spending research years in Italy and West Germany. Mitrović published the first comprehensive theory of historical studies in Serbian historiography after assimilating the concept of total history developed by the Bielefeld School, Mitrović’s version included politics, economy, society and culture bringing new perspectives in historical writing, a concept which his students then started applying in their own research.

Mitrović studied the place of Yugoslavia in European politics between the two world wars and is the author of books and articles about Serbia’s involvement in the First World War, as well as on the economic, social, and cultural, history of the Balkans within the European framework. According to Cambridge University Press Mitrović's Serbia's Great War, 1914–1918 (2005), his only volume to be republished in English, is widely regarded as a major contribution to the topic of Serbia and its role in WWI and is being studied in western scholarship. The first edition was greeted in scholarly circles as a "scrupulously written magnum opus".

Views 
Mitrović was an engaged intellectual who was outspoken about the abuse of history and the revision of facts for political purposes; In the 1990s he was a vocal critic of the regime of Slobodan Milošević, opposing growing nationalism and advocating for a modern European oriented Serbia. Some of his speeches were published by the Belgrade Circle in a book entitled  (Other Serbia). Together with his wife, Ljubinka Trgovčević, he participated in all the protests and forums where they spoke publicly against the war. In 1991 they published an historian's proclamation against the shelling of Dubrovnik, that same year he published a book in which he warned against the effects of what he called parahistory, a type of historical revisionism featuring the distortion of selected sources to indict one side or another. In April 1999 with a number of prominent Serbian intellectual, he was a signatory of  “A plea for peace from Belgrade”. According to German Historian Alexander Korb, as a consequence of his positions that stood out from most Serbian professional and academic circles, Mitrović was never promoted to full member of the Serbian Academy.

Awards
 1975 City of Belgrade October Award
 2001 Herder Prize by the University of Vienna and the Alfred Toepfer Foundation of Hamburg
 2004 Konstantin Jireček Award by Germany's Southeast European Association

Personal life 
Andrej Mitrović was married to fellow historian Ljubinka Trgovčević. He died on 25 August 2013 in Belgrade.

Selected works 
During his lifetime Mitrović published 25 books and approximately 400 articles.

Books 
 Yugoslavia at the Peace Conference in Paris (1969, Zavod za izdavanje udžbenika)
 Time of the Intolerant - Political History of the Great States 1919-1939 (Belgrade 1974)
 Demarcation of Yugoslavia,  politics at the Peace Conference in Paris (Novi Sad 1975)
 Historical in the Magic Mountain (1977)
 Entering the Balkans, Serbia in the Plans of Austria-Hungary and Germany 1908-1918. (1981)
 Engaged and Beautiful (1983)
 Arguments with Clio (1991)
 The Toplica Uprising (1993)
 About God's State and Evil Salvation (2007)
 Culture and History (2008)
 About God's State and Evil Salvation (2007)
 Serbia's Great War 1914–1918 (2007, Purdue University Press)

Notes

References

External links 
 Obituary on the website of SANU
 Netrpeljiv prema netrpeljivima [Bigoted to bigoted] – Obituary published in Danas magazine, author: Dubravka Stojanović
 Interview with Andrej Mitrović from 1999

1937 births
2013 deaths
Writers from Kragujevac
20th-century Serbian historians
Members of the Serbian Academy of Sciences and Arts
Academic staff of the University of Belgrade
University of Belgrade Faculty of Philosophy alumni
Herder Prize recipients